Carole Jo Kabler (June 13, 1938 – March 16, 2017) was an American professional golfer who played on the LPGA Tour. She also competed under her married names: Carole Jo Skala, Carole Jo Callison, and Carole Jo Whitted.

Kabler was born in Eugene, Oregon. She had an outstanding amateur career, winning the Oregon Girls' Junior twice (1954, 1955) and the Oregon Women's Open four times (1955, 1961, 1962, 1965), along with several other wins. In 1955 she won the U.S. Girls' Junior and in 1957 was a semi-finalist in the U.S. Women's Amateur.

Skala turned professional in 1970. She won four times on the LPGA Tour (competing as Carole Jo Skala) between 1973 and 1974.

Kabler married Michael Skala in 1958. They divorced in 1980. In 1981, she married Verne Callison (1918–1993), a two-time winner of the U.S. Amateur Public Links. In 1995, she married John Whitted, Jr. She was inducted into the Pacific Northwest Golf Association's Hall of Fame in 2009.

Professional wins

LPGA Tour wins (4)

Note: Kabler won the Peter Jackson Ladies Classic (which became the du Maurier Classic) before it became a major championship.

LPGA Tour playoff record (0–1)

References

American female golfers
LPGA Tour golfers
Golfers from Oregon
University of Oregon alumni
Sportspeople from Eugene, Oregon
1938 births
2017 deaths
21st-century American women